This page provides supplementary chemical data on phosphorus trifluoride.

Material Safety Data Sheet

Structure and properties

Thermodynamic properties

Spectral data

References

Chemical data pages
Chemical data pages cleanup